Eilema pseudoluteola is a moth of the subfamily Arctiinae first described by Embrik Strand in 1922. It is found in Australia.

References

pseudoluteola